Pink in Red is Bonnie Pink's first live album released under the Pinxter label on August 6, 2003.

Track listing

CD
Your Butterfly
Over the Brown Bridge
Home
Rope Dance
Need You
Present

Tonight, the Night
Bonus Track: Souldiers

DVD
Heaven's Kitchen
Losing Myself
Passive-Progressivism
Thinking of You
Sleeping Child
Tonight, the Night
Communication
New York

Bonnie Pink albums
2003 live albums
2003 video albums
Live video albums